Edi Dadić (born December 22, 1993, in Rijeka, Croatia) is a cross-country skier from Croatia. He competed for Croatia, at Winter olimpics 2014 and Winter olimpics 2018.

References

1993 births
Living people
Olympic cross-country skiers of Croatia
Cross-country skiers at the 2014 Winter Olympics
Cross-country skiers at the 2018 Winter Olympics
Croatian male cross-country skiers
Sportspeople from Rijeka